Uzlovsky District  is an administrative district (raion), one of the twenty-three in Tula Oblast, Russia. Within the framework of municipal divisions, it is incorporated as Uzlovsky Municipal District. It is located in the east of the oblast. Its administrative center is the town of Uzlovaya. Population: 85,173 (2010 Census);  The population of Uzlovaya accounts for 64.9% of the district's total population.

References

Notes

Sources

Districts of Tula Oblast